Guarbecque is a commune in the Pas-de-Calais department in the Hauts-de-France region of France.

Geography
The Canal d'Aire and the Guarbecque stream flow through the commune.

Population

Places of interest
 The Commonwealth War Graves Commission cemetery.
 The church of St.Nicolas, dating from the eleventh century.

See also
Communes of the Pas-de-Calais department

References

External links

 The CWGC graveyard in the communal cemetery

Communes of Pas-de-Calais